Donovan Džavoronok (born 23 July 1997) is a Czech professional volleyball player. He is a member of the Czech Republic national team. At the professional club level, he plays for Itas Trentino.

Honours

Clubs
 FIVB Club World Championship
  Betim 2022 – with Itas Trentino

 CEV Cup
  2021/2022 – with Vero Volley Monza

 CEV Challenge Cup
  2018/2019 – with Vero Volley Monza

 National Championships
 2022/2023  Italian Cup, with Itas Trentino

Individual awards
 2018: European League – Best Outside Spiker

References

External links

 
 Player profile at LegaVolley.it 
 Player profile at Volleybox.net 

1997 births
Living people
Sportspeople from Brno
Czech men's volleyball players
Czech expatriate sportspeople in Italy
Expatriate volleyball players in Italy
Outside hitters